Zhabino is a rural locality (a village) in Sizemskoye Rural Settlement, Sheksninsky District, Vologda Oblast, Russia. The population was 36 as of 2002.

Geography 
Zhabino is located 61 km north of Sheksna (the district's administrative centre) by road. Ivashyovo is the nearest rural locality.

References 

Rural localities in Sheksninsky District